The Chery A13, also known as Fulwin 2, is a subcompact car manufactured by the Chinese automaker Chery. It is the successor of the A15 (Cowin) in the Chery lineup. The car was presented for the first time at the 2008 Beijing Auto Show. A facelifted version was introduced at the 2012 Guangzhou Motor Show.

Its rivals include the FAW Oley, JAC J3, Honda Amaze, Nissan March, Toyota Etios and Suzuki Swift.

Production
It is also manufactured in Ukraine, since 2011, by the local company AvtoZAZ with the name of ZAZ Forza. A total of 4,138 units were produced in 2011, 2,853 units in 2012, and 1,447 units in 2013. Cars assembled in Ukraine are sold in Russia, as Chery Very (hatchback) and Chery Bonus (liftback).

Engine

Gallery

References

External links

A13
Subcompact cars
Sedans
Hatchbacks
Cars introduced in 2008
Cars introduced in 2009
2010s cars